Boletopsis leucomelaena is a species of hydnoid fungus in the family Bankeraceae. It was originally described in 1801 as Boletus leucomelas by Christian Hendrik Persoon. Swiss mycologist  Victor Fayod transferred it to Boletopsis in 1889. The fungus is listed as a priority species in the United Kingdom Biodiversity Action Plan. B. leucomelaena is found in the Pacific Northwest region of North America, in Japan, and throughout Europe, although it is less common than the lookalike B. grisea.

References

External links

Fungi described in 1801
Fungi of Europe
Fungi of North America
Fungi of Japan
Thelephorales
Taxa named by Christiaan Hendrik Persoon